Ankara Ice Skating Palace (formerly Belpa Buz Pateni Sarayı) is an indoor ice skating and ice hockey arena located in the Bahçelievler neighborhood of Ankara, Turkey. It was opened in 1989 and has a capacity of about 1,150 people.

It was built by the Municipality of Ankara as the first Olympic size  ice arena in Turkey. In 2001, the venue was handed over to the Youth and Sports Directorate (G.S.I.M.) of Ankara Province.

Ankara Ice Palace is home to a variety of ice sports events in Ankara including Turkish ice hockey leagues for men's, women's and junior's. Between January 8 through January 14, 2007, the arena hosted the Division III matches of the World Junior Ice Hockey Championships.

International events hosted
 2005 IIHF World U18 Championship Division III Qualification February 18–20, 2005

See also
 Turkish Ice Hockey Super League
 Turkish Ice Hockey Federation

References

Indoor arenas in Turkey
Ice hockey venues in Turkey
Ice Palace
Sports venues completed in 1989